The Day the Earth Stood Still soundtrack (1951) was composed in July, and recorded in August 1951. It was Bernard Herrmann's first soundtrack after he moved from New York to Hollywood. Herrmann chose unusual instrumentation for the film including violin, cello, and bass (all three electric), two theremin electronic instruments (played by Samuel Hoffman and Paul Shure), two Hammond organs, a large studio electric organ, three vibraphones, two glockenspiels, two pianos, two harps, three trumpets, three trombones, four tubas, and extensive percussion including cymbals and tam-tam. Unusual overdubbing and tape-reversal techniques were used, as well. 20th Century Fox later reused the Herrmann title theme in the original pilot episode for Irwin Allen's 1965 TV series Lost in Space. Danny Elfman noted The Day the Earth Stood Stills score inspired his interest in film composing, and made him a fan of Herrmann.

Remake soundtrack 

Tyler Bates was brought in to compose the score for 2008 remake of The Day the Earth Stood Still after Derrickson heard his work on The Devil's Rejects and Slither.  Bates decided that instead of imitating the original score by Bernard Herrmann he would try and convey the message of the new film, which was different, and assumed that most people would not even realize it was a remake.  He said:   
The origins for the sound on the new score came from Bates attending the filming of a few scenes with Reeves and Smith.  When he got back to Los Angeles he created a loop on his GuitarViol to which Derrickson responded "I think that’s the score!" when it was played for him.  Taking just a piece of the original score, Bates utilized the theremin, which Herrmann heavily used for the original film. Bates and the theremin player he hired used the instrument in a manner reminiscent of a sound effect, especially during Klaatu's surgery.

References 

1993 soundtrack albums
2008 soundtrack albums
20th Century Fox Records albums
Bernard Herrmann albums
Film scores
Varèse Sarabande soundtracks